Owoh is a surname. Notable people with the surname include:

 Atisi Owoh (born 1979), Nigerian table tennis player
 Nkem Owoh (born 1958), Nigerian actor and comedian
 Orlando Owoh (1932–2008), Nigerian Yoruba musician

Surnames of Nigerian origin